John Shelley (ジョン・シェリー) is a British illustrator, particularly noted for his work in Japan.

Career
John Shelley (born 1959) grew up in Sutton Coldfield before studying illustration at Bournville School of Art and Manchester Polytechnic under Tony Ross. His first children's trade picture book The Secret in the Matchbox published by André Deutsch and Farrar, Straus and Giroux was shortlisted for the Mother Goose Award in the UK and won a Parents' Choice Award in the US in 1989.

From 1987–2008, he lived in Tokyo, rising to prominence following a series of posters for Parco, the fashion retail chain of Seibu Department Stores, and animated TV commercials for Mitsubishi Estate Co. He received a Dentsu Ad Award for a Suntory Whisky newspaper ad in 1991, and a Nikkei Environmental Ad Award in 1993. From 2000–2007, he was Vice Chairman of the International Committee of the Japan Graphic Designers Association (JAGDA).

Children's books
He has illustrated children's books for all age groups through publishers in the UK, Japan and the US, and has self-authored picture books published in Japan. He is a former Board member of the Society of Children's Book Writers and Illustrators and has been a multiple time nominee for the Astrid Lindgren Memorial Award.

In 2002 the comic character "Brat" was launched in Japan on apparel, collectors figurines and a web comic.

Shelley returned to the UK in 2008 following the death of his wife, and currently lives in Norfolk.

Bibliography
1982  Fatbag  author: Jeremy Strong (A & C Black, UK)
1983  Get Lavinia Goodbody  author: Roger Collinson (Andersen Press, UK) (Alfaguara, Spain)
1984  A Canoe in the Mist   author: Elsie Locke (Jonathan Cape, UK)
1985  Night Eyes  author: Peter Ward (Crystal Clear, UK)
1986  Japanese Vegetarian Cookery  author: Lesley Downer (Jonathan Cape, UK)
1989  The Secret in the Matchbox  author: Val Willis (Andre Deutsch UK / Farrar Straus & Giroux US)
1989  Santa ni Yoroshiku  author: John Shelley (Parco Shuppan, Japan)
1990  The Surprise in the Wardrobe  author: Val Willis (Scholastic UK / Farrar Straus & Giroux US)
1990  Peer Gynt  author: Henrik Ibsen (condensed adaptation by Hiroshi Kawasaki) (Hyoronsha, Japan)
1991  The Mystery in the Bottle   author: Val Willis (Scholastic UK / Farrar Straus & Giroux US)
1991  Ju -ni no Tsukitachi (The Month Brothers)  trans: Sho Suzuki (Miki House, Japan)
1991  Ai o Uranau Sabian Astrology author:Kiyoshi Matsumura (Fun House Books, Japan)
1994  A Father's Diary  author: Fraser Harrison (Media Factory, Japan)
1994  Shikake E-Hon series (3 volumes)  author: John Shelley (Hikari no Kuni, Japan)
1995  Hoppy no Atarashii Uchi (Hoppy's New House)  author: John Shelley (Fukuinkan Shoten, Japan)
1996  Cinderella  trad., adapted by Misako Nakamura (Hikari no Kuni, Japan)
1999  Maho no Kasa (The Magic Umberella)  author: Rose Fyleman (Fukuinkan Shoten, Japan)
2002  King Smelly Feet  author: Hiawyn Oram (Andersen Press, UK / Uitgeverij Sjaloom, Netherlands)
2002  Tinpot Tales   author: John Shelley (Artbox, Japan)
2003  Hawaiian Big Daddy  author: Banbis Snowflower (Nikkei BP, Japan)
2004  MVP  author: Douglas Evans (Front Street, US)
2004  The Deptford Mice (3 volumes)  author: Robin Jarvis (Hayakawa Shobo, Japan)
2005  Anata no Shiranai Andersen series (4 volumes)  author: Hans Christian Andersen (Hyoronsha, Japan)
2005  Sekai Isshu Ohanashi no Ryo (Stories from Around the World)  Ed. Linda Jennings, Trans. Rika Nogi (PHP, Japan)
2005  Bella Baxter series (4 volumes)  author: Jane B. Mason / Sarah Hines Stephens (Aladdin, US)
2005  I Wish I Could be a Ballerina  author: Rosie McCormick (Inky Press, UK/ Backpack Books, US)
2005  Mighty Mike  author: Pascal-Auban Scher (Aeon, Japan)
2006  Charlie Bone Children of the Red King Series (5 volumes)  author: Jenny Nimmo (Tokuma Shoten, Japan)
2006  The Magic Train Ride  author: Pascal-Auban Scher (Aeon, Japan)
2007  The Boat in the Tree  author: Tim Wynne-Jones (Front Street, US)
2007  The Elves and the Shoemaker  author: Brothers Grimm (Fukuinkan Shoten, Japan)
2008  The House of the World  author: John Shelley (Benesse, Japan)
2008  Zipper-kun to Chaku no Maho  author: Machiko Hayakawa (Rironsha, Japan)
2009  Family Reminders  author: Julie Danneberg (Charlesbridge, US)
2010  Nasty  author: Michael Rosen (Barn Owl, UK)
2010  Outside-In  author: Clare Smallman (Frances Lincoln, UK)
2012  Jack to Mame no Ki (Jack and the Beanstalk)  author: John Shelley (Fukuinkan Shoten, Japan)
2012  Halloween Forest  author: Marion Dane Bauer (Holiday House, US)
2013  Ishi no Kyojin  author: Jane Sutcliffe (Komine Shoten, Japan)
2014  Stone Giant: Michelangelo's David and How He Came To Be  author: Jane Sutcliffe (Charlesbridge, US)
2015  Crinkle, Crackle, Crack  author: Marion Dane Bauer (Holiday House, US)
2016  Will's Words: How William Shakespeare Changed the Way You Talk  author: Jane Sutcliffe (Charlesbridge, US)
2016  Yozora o Miageyo  author: Yuriko Matsumura (Fukuinkan Shoten, Japan)
2016  The Life and Adventures of Santa Claus author: L. Frank Baum (Hesperus, UK)
2017  Magic For Sale  author: Carrie Clickard (Holiday House, US)
2019  A Purse Full of Tales: Folk Tales from Korea author: Chan Young Kim, David Carter (Hesperus, UK)
2020  The Boy in the Jam Jar author: Joyce Dunbar (Bloomsbury, UK)

References

Citations

Other sources
FEN Guide November 1991
Mainichi Shimbun Face No.330 2004
The Communicator February 2002

External links
 
 John Shelley Charles Bridge

1959 births
Living people
20th-century illustrators of fairy tales
21st-century illustrators of fairy tales
Alumni of the Bournville College of Art
British children's book illustrators
English illustrators
People from Birmingham, West Midlands